The 2002–03 NBA season was the Hawks' 54th season in the National Basketball Association, and 35th season in Atlanta. Atlanta hosted the 2003 NBA All-Star Game. In the off-season, the Hawks acquired All-Star forward Glenn Robinson from the Milwaukee Bucks. However, DerMarr Johnson missed the entire season with a broken neck sustained from an off-season car accident. With the addition of Robinson, and Theo Ratliff playing his first full season with the team, the Hawks would get off to a 6–4 start, which included a road win over the 3-time defending champion Los Angeles Lakers, 95–83 at Staples Center on November 12. However, they would proceed to struggle as head coach Lon Kruger was fired after Christmas with the team floundering at 11–16. Under replacement Terry Stotts, the Hawks lost 12 of their next 15 games, including two six-game losing streaks in December and January, and held a 19–30 record at the All-Star break. Despite winning six of their final eight games in April, they finished fifth in the Central Division with a 35–47 record.

Robinson averaged 20.8 points, 6.6 rebounds and 1.3 steals per game, while Shareef Abdur-Rahim averaged 19.9 points and 8.4 rebounds per game, and Jason Terry provided the team with 17.2 points, 7.4 assists and 1.6 steals per game. In addition, Dion Glover contributed 9.7 points per game, while Ratliff provided with 8.7 points, 7.5 rebounds and led the team with 3.2 blocks per game, and Ira Newble contributed 7.7 points per game.

Following the season, Robinson was traded to the Philadelphia 76ers after just one season in Atlanta, while Newble signed as a free agent with the Cleveland Cavaliers, and Johnson and Emanual Davis were both released to free agency.

Offseason

Draft picks

Roster

Roster Notes
 Guard/forward DerMarr Johnson missed the entire season due to a broken neck sustained from a car accident.

Regular season

Season standings

z - clinched division title
y - clinched division title
x - clinched playoff spot

Record vs. opponents

Game log

Player statistics

Season

Awards and records

Transactions

References

See also
 2002-03 NBA season

Atlanta Hawks seasons
Atlanta Haw
Atlanta Haw
Atlanta Hawks